Tell Me Where It Hurts may refer to:

 "Tell Me Where It Hurts" (Garbage song), 2007
 "Tell Me Where It Hurts" (Milli Vanilli song), 1991
 Tell Me Where It Hurts (film), a 1974 TV movie directed by Paul Bogart